The Kansas Supreme Court has ruled that the necessity defense may not be used when the harm the defendant claims to be avoiding through his actions was legal, while the action undertaken to prevent it was illegal.  This question became an issue in the 2010 trial of Scott Roeder for the assassination of notorious late-term abortion provider George Tiller.  Judge Warren Wilbert refused to allow the defense to present a plea of necessity, but did allow them to present a case for voluntary manslaughter on the grounds that the defendant sincerely believed that he was committing a smaller crime to prevent a greater evil.

References

Kansas law